Ibach may refer to:

 Ibach, Germany
 Ibach, Switzerland

People
 Karl Ibach (1915–1990), German writer and politician
 Karl Ibach (footballer) (1892–1953), Swiss footballer

Companies 
 Rud. Ibach Sohn German piano maker